The phylum Sarcomastigophora belongs to the Protista or protoctista kingdom and it includes many unicellular or colonial, autotrophic, or heterotrophic organisms. It is characterized by flagella, pseudopodia, or both.

Taxonomy
It is divided into three subphyla: the Mastigophora, the Sarcodina and the Opalinata.

It is polyphyletic, and it is not a universally recognized classification. It places great significance upon method of locomotion in generating the taxonomy.

It can be described either as:
kingdom Protista → phylum Sarcomastigophora
or in older classifications as
 phylum Protozoa → subphylum Sarcomastigophora.

Characteristics
It gets its name from the combination of "Sarcodina" (which is an older term used for amoeboids) and "Mastigophora" (which is an older term for flagellates).

The characteristics of phylum sarcomastigophora are :

(1)  Nucleus is of one type except in the stages of certain foraminifera.

(2)  Locomotory organ either pseudopodia or flagella or both.

(3)  Reproduction asexual , but when sexually it is essentially by syngamy

(4)  Spore formation is absent.

Example : Amoeba, Euglena etc.

See also
Protozoa
Foraminifera
Radiolaria
Red Tide
Volvox

References

External links

Obsolete eukaryote taxa
Eukaryote phyla
Polyphyletic groups